Middelveldsche Akerpolder is a neighborhood of Amsterdam, Netherlands, located in the urban district of Nieuw-West.

Amsterdam Nieuw-West
Neighbourhoods of Amsterdam